The Epistle to Yemen or Yemen Letter was an important communication written by Maimonides and sent to the Yemenite Jews. The epistle was written in 1173/4.

The need for the epistle arose because of religious persecution and heresy in 12th century Yemen, marked by a pseudo-Messiah that had arisen there. The man who claimed to be Israel's Messiah began preaching a syncretistic religion that combined Judaism and Islam, and claimed that the Bible had foretold his coming as a prophet. One of the leaders of the Jewish community in Yemen, Rabbi Ya'akov, the son of the illustrious Rabbi Netanel Fayyumi, had addressed his concerns in a letter which he had sent to Maimonides, who was in Egypt. Rabbi Ya'akov had conjectured that perhaps the influences of the stars were responsible for these occurrences, to which conjectures Maimonides replied that Rabbi Ya'akov ought to expunge from his heart the vain concept of being able to determine the influences of the constellations, yet counselled him and the Jewish people of Yemen on how they were to act with respect to the pseudo-Messiah in order to be saved from his harmful effects.

Background

The average Jewish population in Yemen for many centuries had been very small. The Jews were scattered throughout the country, but were successful in business and acquired books about the history of their faith. However, contemporary events in Yemen show that, in the last quarter of the 12th century, the Yemeni populace was shaken by a revolt against Saladin as sultan, while Shia Muslims and the indigenous tribesmen began to persecute the Jewish faith in the Yemen at that time.  

The persecution and increasing apostasy led one of Yemen's most respected Jewish scholars, Rabbi Ya'akov, to write for counsel to Rabbi Moshe ben Maimon, better known as Maimonides.

Maimonides response was written in Judeo-Arabic that was later translated into Hebrew by Nahum Ma'arabi. This letter made a tremendous impression on Yemenite Jewry, and effectively stopped the new religious movement. It also served as a source of strength, consolation and support for the faith in the continuing persecution.

Maimonides interceded with Saladin in Egypt, and shortly thereafter the persecution came to an end.

Epistle's introduction
Maimonides, in his Epistle to Yemen, heaps lavish praises upon the Jews of Yemen in his day, and uses hyperbolic speech to describe the condition in which he found them. Evidently, Maimonides had knowledge of the Jews of Yemen, and avouched that they maintained a strict adherence to Jewish law and custom, long before his writings became widespread throughout Yemen. In his Epistle to Yemen, Maimonides stresses the state of high-learnedness and aptitude of the Jews of Yemen. Unfortunately, the rhyme employed in his verse has been lost in the translation. The Epistle was sent from Egypt to Aden in anno 1173/4 CE.

See also
History of responsa
Rabbinic literature
Rishonim

References

External links

Oral Reading of Epistle to Yemen with Translation and Explanation
אגרת תימן - ספריה למתלמדים Hebrew Translation (with English footnotes by Shlomo Goldman)

Jewish philosophical and ethical texts
Jews and Judaism in Yemen
Works by Maimonides